This is a list of now defunct airlines from Niger.

See also

 List of airlines of Niger
 List of airports in Niger

References

Niger
Airlines
Airlines, defunct